Javier Conde Becerra (born February 19, 1975), better known as Javier Conde, is one of the most famous Spanish bullfighters to come from Málaga.

Biography
The Malagueño began bullfighting on June 4, 1989, in Benalmádena.
He is very popular with the crowds in and also outside the ring. Conde's very natural style and striking good looks, together with his polite nature, makes him popular with the press.

On December 14, 2001, he married successful flamenco singer Estrella Morente in 'Nuestra Señora de las Angustias basilica' in Granada and has 2 children.

Filmography

 The Bridge of San Luis Rey (2004)..Camila's Matador
aka Pont du roi Saint-Louis, Le (France)
aka Puente de San Luis Rey, El (Spain)
 Hable con ella (2002) (uncredited)..Bullfighter
aka Talk to Her (International: English title)

Television

 XXI premios Goya (2007) (TV) (uncredited) As Himself - Audience Member
"Corazón de..." .... Himself (1 episode, 2000)
 Episode dated 26 October 2000 (2000) TV Episode ...Himself
 "Qué me dices" .... Himself (3 episodes, 1996–1997)
 Episode dated 18 February 1997 (1997) TV Episode ..Himself
 Episode dated 12 November 1996 (1996) TV Episode ..Himself
 Episode dated 16 September 1996 (1996) TV Episode .Himself
 Corazón de..."
 Episode dated 3 January 2006 (2006) TV Episode ....Himself
"Corazón, corazón"
 Episode dated 26 November 2005 (2005) TV Episode ..Himself

See also
 List of bullfighters
Bullfighting
Torero

References
 
 https://web.archive.org/web/20080208155754/http://www.hola.com/anteriores/2001/12/19/ho2994s2/

External links
 (Photos)
 

1975 births
Living people
Sportspeople from Málaga
Spanish bullfighters